Anuj Dhar is an Indian author and former journalist. He has published several books around the locus of death of Subhas Chandra Bose that propounds theories about his living for several years after the purported plane crash, thus contradicting the current  consensus. Dhar is also the founder-trustee of a not for profit organisation, Mission Netaji, which campaigns for the declassification of documents concerning Bose.

Claims
Dhar has claimed that Bose had lived in the Uttar Pradesh state of India as Gumnami Baba or Bhagwanji a hermit till 1985. The claims were debunked by the Mukherjee Commission which rejected any linkage between the two, in light of a DNA profiling test. The Commission rejected the plane crash theory and stated that Netaji ‘did not die in the plane crash as alleged’ and that ‘the ashes in the Japanese temple are not of Netaji’. However Indian Government did not accept the findings of the commission.

He also believes that Bose escaped to Russia (then, Soviet Union) after the crash and has accused successive Congress governments of being a part of broader conspiracy to keep Netaji dead. The Mukherjee commission did not locate any relevant material in the KGB archives.

In 2005, the Taiwan government provided emails to Dhar that it has no records of a plane crash during the period of 14 August to 25 October 1945, at the old Matsuyama Airport (now Taipei Domestic Airport). These records played a major role in the final assertion of Mukherjee Commission about the implausibility of Bose dying from an air crash. Historian Sugata Bose has rejected the analysis in light of the fact that the region and the airport was under Japanese occupation until 1946 and it was around 1949 when the Taiwaniese government finally consolidated itself.

In the book No Secrets, Dhar states that, according to a newspaper article published by Bose's elder brother Sarat Chandra Bose in The Nation, Bose was in China in October 1949.

Dhar's 2008 book, CIA's Eye on South Asia, compiled declassified Central Intelligence Agency records on India and its neighbours.

Criticism
Netaji biographer Leaonard A. Gordon also penned a critical note on Dhar in a postscript of his book Brothers Against the Raj. There Gordon alleged that Dhar misuses the Subhas Chandra Bose death mystery issue for contemporary Indian political purposes.

Bibliography

See also
 Bose: Dead/Alive, 2017 miniseries based on Anuj Dhar's book India's Biggest Cover-up
 Gumnaami, 2019 Indian Bengali-language film based on Anuj Dhar's  book Conundrum

References

Sources 
 
 
 
 

Year of birth missing (living people)
Living people
Indian bloggers
Indian political writers
Indian journalists
Indian conspiracy theorists
Indian non-fiction writers
21st-century Indian non-fiction writers
Subhas Chandra Bose